Somera virens is a moth of the family Notodontidae first described by Wolfgang Dierl in 1976. It is found in the north-eastern Himalayas, Sundaland and the Chinese provinces of Hainan and Yunnan.

Subspecies
Somera virens virens (north-eastern Himalayas, Sundaland)
Somera virens watsoni Schintlmeister, 1997 (China: Hainan, Yunnan)

References

Moths described in 1976
Notodontidae